The Standard SC engine is a cast-iron overhead valve straight-four engine designed and initially produced by Standard Triumph. Over its production life displacement grew from an initial size of just over 800 cc to nearly 1500 cc. Introduced in the Standard Eight in 1953, it would eventually be used in a wide range of vehicles from Standard, Triumph, and MG.

Origin 
In 1948 a "single model" policy was instituted at Standard, centred on the Standard Vanguard. Standard Triumph chairman John Black nevertheless wanted to add a new model below the existing Vanguard in the company's lineup, and so work had started in 1950/1951 on a new car and engine to power it, both of which were named "SC" for "small car". The car would face competition in the marketplace from the recently introduced Ford Anglia, Austin A30, and Morris Minor. Consideration was given to using the existing Vanguard engine, but this linered engine was considered too expensive for the intended market. The engine designed for the new small car would use the tooling installed to produce the engine for the Triumph Mayflower, and so would have to have the same bore centres as that earlier design. Austin's new A-series engine and the original Standard SC shared the same bore and stroke and displacement, leading some to wonder if Standard engineers had copied the Austin design for their own. Other significant differences between the engines, including the number and placement of intake and exhaust ports and the ability of the SC to be expanded to nearly 1.5 L, make this unlikely.

However Reliant in 1959 would begin work on a new overhead-valve (OHV) engine design to replace its aging pre-war Austin Seven sidevalve based engine, which was derived from a Chinese copy of the cast-iron Standard Eight engine after it ceased production in 1959. It would go on to become the all-alloy OHV introduced in the 1962 Reliant Regal as well as the 1964 Reliant Rebel and laid claim to being Britain’s first mass produced all-aluminium engine.

Model history

800 

The new engine first appeared in the Standard Eight in 1953. With a displacement of  the engine produced  at 4500 rpm.

950 
In 1954 the Standard Ten was introduced as a more well-appointed version of the Standard Eight, while sharing the earlier car's frame and transmission.

The first engine offered in the Triumph Herald was also the 948 cc SC. Power was claimed to be .

1150 
Standard-Triumph was taken over by Leyland Motors in 1961, which made available new resources to develop the Herald. The car was re-launched in April 1961 with an  engine as the Herald 1200. To gain the extra displacement the cylinders were placed out of centre which cleared the studs so that a bigger bore could be used. Twin carburettors were no longer standard fitment to any of the range, although they remained an option. The standard was a single down-draught Solex carburettor.

The 1147 cc version of the engine was also used in the first model of the Triumph Spitfire.

A special light-alloy 8-port racing cylinder head used on the later Le Mans and Macau Spitfires' 1147 cc engines was labelled "70X". A version of this head for the later 1296 cc engine was labelled "79X", the numbers representing the displacement of the engines in cubic inches.

1300 
This version was fitted to the new Triumph Herald 13/60 and Triumph 1300 saloons. When it debuted in the Triumph 1300 with a single Stromberg CD150 carburettor it developed .

With the 1970 introduction of the MK4 Spitfire the UK version, with a 9:1 compression ratio and twin SU HS2 carburettors, that had previously been rated at 75 hp was now rated at  due to the adoption of the German DIN rating system; the actual output was the same for the early Mark IV. The less powerful North American version still used a single Zenith Stromberg carburettor and an 8.5:1 compression ratio. Displacement remained at 1296 cc, but in 1973 larger big-end bearings were fitted to rationalize production with the TR6 2.5 L engines, which somewhat dampened its previously high-revving nature. Some detuning was also done to meet new emissions laws.

1500 
Later used in the Triumph Spitfire 1500, this final incarnation of the engine was rather rough and more prone to failure than the earlier models, although torque was greatly increased. While most export-market Spitfire 1500s had a compression ratio reduced to 8.0:1, the American market model was fitted with a single Zenith-Stromberg carburettor and a compression ratio reduced to 7.5:1 to allow it to run on lower octane unleaded fuel. After adding a catalytic converter and exhaust gas recirculating system, the US market engine only delivered . The notable exception to this was the 1976 model year, when the compression ratio was raised to 9.1:1. This improvement was short-lived, however, as the ratio was again reduced to 7.5:1 for the remaining years of production.

The UK received the most powerful variant of all.

The 1500 engine was also used in the MG Midget 1500 (1974–80) coupled to a modified Morris Marina gearbox.

Design
Design of the engine was headed by David Eley, a long-time Standard employee. The engine had a cast-iron block and cylinder head, and a pressed-steel sump. Spark-plugs and camshaft were on the left side of the engine, while the inlet and exhaust manifolds were on the right. The camshaft, which drove the distributor and oil pump through a spur gear, was itself chain-driven off the nose of the crankshaft, with the drive covered by a pressed-steel cover. The cylinder head had four inlet and four outlet ports, in contrast to some of its competitors who had some ports siamesed. The crankshaft was carried in three main bearings. Crankshaft and connecting rods were steel, while the pistons were light alloy. The ancillaries were mounted on the left side of the engine, while the water pump and thermostat were in a separate casting attached to the front of the engine.

Inline 6 

An inline six cylinder engine was developed from the SC four. The Standard Triumph Six first appeared in 1960 in the Standard Vanguard Six.

The engine was next used in the Triumph Vitesse, a sports saloon based on the Herald, in 1962. The Vitesse got the 2 L engine in 1966.

The Triumph 2000 replaced the Vanguard Six in 1963 when Leyland discontinued the Standard marque. The 2 L six was later used in the Spitfire-based GT6 coupé from 1966 to 1974.

In 1967 the engine replaced the Standard inline-four in the new Triumph TR5 and TR250 models.

This engine was succeeded by the Leyland PE 146 and PE 166 engines designed by Triumph for the new Rover SD1. Although the earliest proposals for this project were for a new overhead camshaft cylinder-head on the original block, limitations in the Triumph block caused this option to be rejected, and the new OHC six shared no parts with the old Triumph engine.

Replacement 
Although never directly replaced by another engine in the Triumph Spitfire, the SC was superseded by the Triumph slant-four as the premier power unit in the higher specification Dolomites.

References

Automobile engines
Triumph Motor Company engines
Straight-four engines
Gasoline engines by model